The Itaipava São Paulo Indy 300 presented by Nestlé was an event in the IRL IndyCar Series, contested in the 2010 through 2013 IndyCar Series seasons.

The event was originally announced on November 25, 2009, as the first championship event for the series outside North America and Japan, and the first American open-wheel race in the country since the Rio 200 at Jacarepaguá in the 2000 CART season. Due to a lengthy distance to travel from most team bases, the event promoters offered each team a six-figure sum of money, as well as paying for all expenses.

The street circuit race track was laid out in the Santana district, birthplace of legendary Brazilian driver Ayrton Senna and Brazilian auto racing pioneer Chico Landi.  The main straightaway of the circuit was along the Sambadrome of Anhembi and utilized portions of the Marginal Tietê service drive. The Anhembi Convention Center was used for support facilities and spectator attractions. The circuit was one of two IndyCar Series circuits (Baltimore the other) to have pit lanes not positioned at the start-finish line; São Paulo's was positioned after turn four.

Past results

2010: Race shortened due to rain and two-hour time limit.
2011: Rain forced a postponement of the race after 15 laps. Race resumed on Monday and was shortened due to rain and two-hour time limit.

See also
 Brazilian Grand Prix

References

External links
The official website of the São Paulo Indy 300  
IndyCar.com race page 2013

 
Recurring sporting events established in 2010
Tourist attractions in São Paulo